Charlotte "Charlie" Thomas (born 5 September 2003) is an Australian rules footballer. She was selected by the West Coast Eagles with pick 3 in the 2021 AFL Women's draft, and  made her debut in round 1 of the 2022 AFL Women's season.

Career
Thomas played 6 games for Subiaco Football Club in the WAFL Women's in 2020, and 1 game in 2021, being injured for most of that season with a fractured arm.

In the 2021 AFL Women's draft, Thomas was picked by the West Coast Eagles with pick number 3. The guernsey number assigned to her was number 3, which was presented to her at West Coast's 2022 AFLW season launch by Andrew Gaff, who has the number 3 guernsey on the men's team.

Thomas played her first AFLW game on 8 January 2022, against  in round 1 of the 2022 season. The role she plays is as a tall utility.

References

External links 

2003 births
Living people
West Coast Eagles (AFLW) players
Subiaco Football Club players
Australian rules footballers from Western Australia